Sprinkles Cupcakes is a bakery chain established in 2005. It is considered the world's first cupcake bakery.

History 
In 2002, Candace Nelson and her husband Charles Nelson, both investment bankers, visited Candace's sister in New York and tried the cupcakes at Magnolia Bakery. Candace decided that it was "time for cupcakes to stop being the backup dancer to cakes". Having started a custom cake business after attending Tante Marie's Pastry Program in San Francisco, she set her sights on cupcakes. "I was taking orders for special occasion cakes which I came to realize are, by definition, reserved for special, infrequent occasions," she said. "I wanted to create an artful and handcrafted dessert, yet one which people could eat on a daily basis...which led me to reinvent and elevate the lowly cupcake."

Although starting a cupcake bakery was a "high-risk venture" and the bakery business was in a four-year no carb decline, the Nelsons pursued their dream. Their "sleek, minimalistic" store was designed by an architect from Vienna and the logo and packaging were created by a former Martha Stewart employee with design help from graphic designers Kevin Hagen and David Irvin. On April 13, 2005, the Nelsons opened Sprinkles' first store on Little Santa Monica Boulevard in Beverly Hills. The first day, the cupcakes sold out in three hours, and 2,000 cupcakes were sold the first week.

Candace is described as taking a "sophisticated" twist on the classic cupcake, using ingredients like sweet cream butter, pure Nielsen-Massey Madagascar Bourbon vanilla, Callebaut chocolate, fresh bananas and carrots, real strawberries, and natural citrus zests. She also creates products such as vegan and gluten-free cupcakes and even cupcakes with dog-friendly ingredients. The cupcakes are baked fresh daily and are free from preservatives, trans fats, and artificial flavors.

In 2018, Sprinkles began offering layer cakes in varying flavors.

Locations 
Sprinkles has 24 locations throughout the United States (Beverly Hills, Chicago, Dallas, Georgetown, The Grove, Downtown Los Angeles, Westlake Village, Houston, La Jolla, New York City, Palo Alto, Scottsdale, Las Vegas, Tampa, San Ramon, and Newport Beach), with plans to open in 15 more cities including London and Tokyo. The Nelsons also started a traveling "Sprinklesmobile", a Mercedes Sprinter van designed by Sprinkles architect Andrea Lenardin and built by "Pimp My Ride's" West Coast Customs. In 2007 the company developed a line of cupcake mixes sold exclusively through Sprinkles and Williams Sonoma stores in the United States and Canada. In February 2011 Sprinkles released an iPhone app that features free cupcakes and virtual gifting.

Sprinkles Cupcakes opened its first New York City store on May 13, 2011.  A second New York City store opened at Brookfield Place in the fall of 2013. In 2013, a branch was opened in Kuwait. In late 2016, a location opened in Downtown Disney at the Disneyland Resort in Anaheim, California.

Cupcake ATM 

On March 6, 2012, Sprinkles Cupcakes opened the world's first Cupcake ATM in Beverly Hills. The second opened a few months later in Chicago. A third is at the company's bakery in Dallas, and the fourth outside the Lexington Avenue branch in New York City, with a future one planned for Georgetown. The Cupcake ATMs dispense cupcakes and doggie cupcakes 24 hours a day and are continuously restocked with freshly baked cupcakes. Each can hold up to 600 cupcakes at a time.

Sprinkles Ice Cream 
On May 24, 2012, Sprinkles expanded its dessert brand with the opening of Sprinkles Ice Cream next door to its cupcake bakery in Beverly Hills, and later in 2013, in Newport Beach's Corona del Mar Plaza and in Dallas in The Plaza at Preston Center. The shop serves ice cream in unusual flavors like red velvet, Cap'n Crunch and salty caramel and carries a cookie line with a modern twist on traditional flavors including salted oatmeal cornflake and peanut butter pretzel chip. They now offer nationwide shipping and have a traveling ice cream cart. Sprinkles Ice Cream is slow churned in order to create a denser, creamier, and more flavorful ice cream.

Celebrity endorsements 
Sprinkles has gained many celebrity endorsements. Oprah Winfrey, Barbra Streisand, Tyra Banks, Katie Holmes, Paris Hilton, Blake Lively, Ryan Seacrest, Tom Cruise, and Jake Gyllenhaal are among its customers.

Barbra Streisand was one of Sprinkles' first customers and introduced Oprah Winfrey to the brand by sending her a box of cupcakes. Only eight months after opening Sprinkles, Charles and Candace received a call from Harpo Studios that Oprah needed 300 cupcakes for her studio audience in Chicago the next morning for Breakfast with Oprah, wherein she showcases her favorite delicacies. The couple managed to catch an overnight flight, and the cupcakes were featured on Oprah's show. Soon after, sales in their Beverly Hills location increased 50%, to 1,500 cupcakes daily.

Sprinkles has also appeared on The Today Show and Nightline, as well as Entourage and The Girls Next Door.

Sprinkles played a role in Tom Cruise's courtship of Katie Holmes. At Christmas in 2007, the Cruises sent out boxes of holiday-themed Sprinkles cupcakes to friends and associates.

References

External links 

Bakeries of the United States
Food and drink companies established in 2005
Retail companies established in 2005
Companies based in Beverly Hills, California